The Shri Shankaracharya Institute of Technology and Management (SSITM) Bhilai is a unit of Shri Shankaracharya Technical Campus (SSTC), managed by the Shri Gangajali Education Society (SGES), approved by All India Council for Technical Education (AICTE) and affiliated to Chhattisgarh Swami Vivekanand Technical University Bhilai (CSVTU), and is named after Adi Shankaracharya. The college offers education in Bachelor of Engineering, Master of Engineering and MBA.

History 

The college, established in 2008, is the third engineering college added to the chain of college/schools managed by SGES, following Shri Shankaracharya College of Engineering and Technology & Shri Shankaracharya Engineering College.

Overview 

SSITM Bhilai is an ISO 9001:2008 certified institution. WIPRO Mission 10X Learning Centre (MTLC) has been set up to train students on latest technologies. The College provides more than 400 computer systems.

Administration 

The Governing body comprises representatives of the Society, Nominees of Technical University ( CSVTU ), Bhilai, Nomineers of AICTE ; State Govt. The Director of the college is the ex-officio members secretary of the Governing Body.  All examinations are conducted by CSVTU at the same time for all affiliated engineering colleges and the degree also bears the sole name of CSVTU.

Courses 

The Institute offers the following four-year undergraduate degree courses in the following branches
  Computer Science and Engineering
  Electronics and Telecommunication                                     
  Electrical and Electronics
  Information Technology.
  Mechanical Engineering.
  Civil Engineering.
 
The Institute also offers following two-year postgraduate degree courses, in following specializations
 Digital Electronics (Master of Engineering)
 Production Engineering (Master of Engineering)
 Power System & Engineering (Master of Engineering)
 Human Resources Management (Master of Business Administration)
 Marketing Management (Master of Business Administration)
 Systems Management (Master of Business Administration)
 Finance Management (Master of Business Administration)
 Production Management (Master of Business Administration)

The Institute also offers following three-year diploma courses, in following specializations
 Civil Engineering
 Mechanical Engineering

Departments 

SSITM has the following departments:
  Department of Information Technology 
  Department of Computer Science & Engineering
  Department of Electronics & Telecommunication Engineering
  Department of Electrical & Electronics Engineering
  Department of Mechanical Engineering 
  Department of Civil Engineering
  Department of Business Administration
  Department of Applied Physics
  Department of Applied Chemistry
  Department of Applied Mathematics
  Department of Humanities

Hostel 

SGES offers separate boys and girls hostels in different campus. There are four girls hostels, three in a row at ten minutes walking distance from college and one is a little farther for which college provides free bus facility. There are two boys hostel(within the college campus), one for only first year students and second for the rest.

See also 

 Shri Shankaracharya College of Engineering and Technology
 Shri Shankaracharya Engineering College
 Shri Gangajali Education Society
 Chhattisgarh Swami Vivekanand Technical University

References

External links 
 SSITM home page
 SSTC home page

Engineering colleges in Chhattisgarh
Education in Bhilai
2008 establishments in Chhattisgarh
Educational institutions established in 2008